The 2005 Senior College Player Selections was the second annual NPF player draft.  It was held February 7, 2005 to assign division I college players to pro teams for 2005 season.  The first selection was Southern Illinois' Amy Harre, picked by the expansion Chicago Bandits.  Athletes are not allowed by the NCAA to sign professional contracts until their collegiate seasons have ended.  The Arizona Heat made their selection in round 1, but passed on all their subsequent selections.  NPF teams' exclusive rights to players selected in the 2005 draft expired July 15, 2005.

2005 Senior College Player Selections

Following are the 24 selections from the 2005 NPF Senior Draft:

Position key: 
C = Catcher; UT = Utility infielder; INF = Infielder; 1B = First base; 2B =Second base SS = Shortstop; 3B = Third base; OF = Outfielder; RF = Right field; CF = Center field; LF = Left field;  P = Pitcher; RHP = right-handed Pitcher; LHP = left-handed Pitcher; DP =Designated player
Positions are listed as combined for those who can play multiple positions.

Round 1

Round 2

Round 3

Round 4

References 

2005 in softball
National Pro Fastpitch drafts